This is a timeline documenting events of Jazz in the year 1971.

Events

May
 2 – The 5th Montreux Jazz Festival started in Montreux, Switzerland (May 2 – June 24).

July
 2 – The 18th Newport Jazz Festival started in Newport, Rhode Island (July 2 – 5).

September
 17 – The 14th Monterey Jazz Festival started in Monterey, California (September 17 – 19).

Album releases

Art Ensemble of Chicago: Phase One
Derek Bailey: Solo Guitar
Gato Barbieri: Fenix
Carla Bley: Escalator Over The Hill
Willem Breuker: Instant Composers Pool 008
Gary Burton: Live in Tokyo
Alice Coltrane
Universal Consciousness
Journey in Satchidananda
Compost: Compost
Chick Corea
Circle 2: Gathering
Piano Improvisations
The Song of Singing
Don Ellis: Tears of Joy
Bill Evans
The Bill Evans Album
From Left to Right
Jan Garbarek: Sart
Freddie Hubbard
First Light
Sing Me a Song of Songmy
Straight Life
Keith Jarrett
Birth
Gary Burton & Keith Jarrett
The Mourning of a Star
Mahavishnu Orchestra: The Inner Mounting Flame
Joe McPhee: Trinity
Oliver Nelson: Swiss Suite
Jean-Luc Ponty: Open Strings
Terje Rypdal: Terje Rypdal
Pharoah Sanders: Black Unity
Spontaneous Music Ensemble: So What Do You Think
Keith Tippett: Septober Energy
Stanley Turrentine: Salt Song
Weather Report: Weather Report
Tim Weisberg: Tim Weisberg
Mike Westbrook: Metropolis
Paul Winter
Icarus
Road
Joe Zawinul: Zawinul

Deaths

 January
 10 – Ernie Caceres, American saxophonist (born 1911).
 19 – Harry Shields, American clarinetist (born 1899).

 February
 1 – Harry Roy, British clarinettist and bandleader (born 1900).
 5 – Chas Remue, Belgian reedist (born 1903).
 11 – Harry Arnold, Swedish saxophonist and bandleader (born 1920).
 22 – Derek Humble, English alto saxophonist (born 1930).

 March
 26 – Harold McNair, Jamaican-born saxophonist and flute player (lung cancer) (born 1931).
 28 – Morey Feld, American drummer (born 1915).

 April
 1 – Baby Face Willette, American Hammond organist (born 1933).
 12 – Wynton Kelly, Jamaican pianist and composer (born 1931).
 28 – Sonny White, American pianist (born 1917).

 May
 8 – Gus Deloof, Belgian trumpeter, composer, and arranger (born 1909).

 June
 11 – Bert Ambrose, English bandleader and violinist (born 1896).

 July
 2 – Bobby Donaldson, American drummer (born 1922).
 6 – Louis Armstrong, American singer and trumpeter (born 1901).
 8 – Charlie Shavers, American trumpeter (born 1920).

 August
 13 – King Curtis, American saxophonist (born 1934).
 17 – Tab Smith, American saxophonist (born 1909).
 27 – Lil Hardin Armstrong, American pianist, singer, and band leader (born 1898).
 28 – Lou McGarity, American trombonist, violinist, and vocalist (born 1917).

 November
 1 – Irene Daye, American singer (born 1918).
 3 – Gary McFarland, American composer, arranger, vibraphonist, and vocalist (born 1933).

 Unknown date
 Gregor or Krikor Kélékian, Armenian-French bandleader (born 1898).

Births

 January
 1
 Chris Potter, American saxophonist.
 Kenya Hathaway, American singer.
 4 – Nigel Hitchcock, English saxophonist.
 5 – Stian Carstensen, Norwegian multi-instrumentalist.
 20 – Zoe Rahman, English pianist and composer.

 February
 16 – Øyvind Brandtsegg, Norwegian percussionist.
 26 – Erykah Badu, American singer-songwriter, record producer, disc jockey, activist, and actress.

 March
 23 – Leszek Możdżer, Polish pianist, music producer, and film music composer.

 April
 2 – Solveig Slettahjell, Norwegian singer.
 10 – Joey Defrancesco, American organist, trumpeter, and vocalist.
 16 – Max Beesley, English actor, singer, and pianist.
 25 – Trygve Seim, Norwegian saxophonist.
 26 – Christian Wallumrød, Norwegian pianist and composer.

 May
 6 – Till Brönner, German trumpeter, singer, composer, arranger, and producer.
 12 – Kristin Asbjørnsen, Norwegian singer and composer.
 15 – Erland Dahlen, Norwegian drummer and percussionist.
 31 – Arun Luthra, Indo-Anglo-American saxophonist, konnakol artist, composer, arranger, and band leader.

 June
 4 – Shoji Meguro, Japanese composer, guitarist, and director.
 7
 Håvard Fossum, Norwegian saxophonistand flautist.
 Jesse Green, American pianist, composer, arranger, and record producer.
 9 – Gerald Preinfalk, Austrian saxophonist, clarinetist, and composer.
 15 – Nasheet Waits, American drummer.
 29 – Ingar Zach, Norwegian percussionist.

 July

 17 – Liberty Ellman, English guitarist.
 29 – Lisa Ekdahl, Swedish singer and songwriter.

 August
 14 – Walter Blanding, American saxophonist and clarinetist.
 17 – Ed Motta, Brazilian singer and keyboardist.

 September
 15 – Graham Wood, Australian jazz pianist (died 2017).
 20 – Sean J. Kennedy, American drummer.
 23 – Ingebrigt Håker Flaten, Norwegian bassist.

 October
 19 – Helén Eriksen, Norwegian saxophonist and singer.
 20 – Russell Gunn, American trumpeter.
 24 – Frode Berg, Norwegian bassist.
 26 – Vijay Iyer, American pianist and composer.

 November
 1 – Antonio Sánchez, Mexican-American drummer and composer.
 4 – Gregory Porter, American vocalist.
 28 – Robert Mitchell, British pianist, composer, and teacher.

 December
 1 – Mika Pohjola, Finnish pianist and composer.
 11 – Mattias Ståhl, Swedish vibraphonist, clarinetist, and composer.
 18 – Noriko Matsueda, Japanese pianist and composer.

 Unknown date
 Carla Kihlstedt, American composer, violinist, vocalist, and multi-instrumentalist.
 Dominique Atkins, British singer, Grace.
 Kasper Tranberg, Danish trumpeter and flugelhornist.
 Marcus Johnson, American keyboardist.
 Tom Norris, English musician, composer, ensemble leader, and songwriter.
 Vellu Halkosalmi, Finnish trombonist and composer.

See also

 1970s in jazz
 List of years in jazz
 1971 in music

References

External links 
 History Of Jazz Timeline: 1971 at All About Jazz

Jazz
Jazz by year